A generalist is a person with a wide array of knowledge on a variety of subjects, useful or not.  It may also refer to:

Occupations 
 a physician who provides general health care, as opposed to a medical specialist; see also:
 General practitioner, a medical doctor who treats acute and chronic illnesses and provides preventive care and health education to patients
 Family medicine, comprehensive health care for people of all ages
 Information Technology Generalist, a technology professional proficient in many facets of information technology without any specific specialty

Biology 
 Generalist species, a species which can survive in multiple habitats or eat food from multiple sources
 Generalist Genes Hypothesis, a theory of learning abilities and disabilities

Other 
 "Jack of all trades, master of none", a figure of speech about generalists
 a multipotentialite, someone having exceptional interest, and talent, in two or more fields.
 Philomath, someone who loves learning
Polymath, someone whose knowledge spans a substantial number of subjects
 Generalist channel, a TV or radio channel without a particular target audience

See also
 Encyclopedism, an outlook that aims to include a wide range of knowledge in a single work
 Interdisciplinarity, the combining of two or more academic disciplines in one activity
 Laity, religious group members who are not clerics, sometimes also used metaphorically to describe non-specialists
 Jack of all trades (disambiguation)
 Specialist (disambiguation)